Redstone Science Fiction was an online science fiction magazine. The first issue was published June 1, 2010 and maintained a regular monthly schedule until the September 1, 2012 issue.

Redstone Science Fiction (often called Redstone SF) has published fiction by Cory Doctorow, Mary Robinette Kowal, Ken MacLeod, Cat Rambo, Hannu Rajaniemi, Vylar Kaftan, Lavie Tidhar, and others. The magazine has conducted interviews with many editors and authors in the science fiction field, including Lou Anders, John Joseph Adams, Mary Robinette Kowal, Vylar Kaftan, Cat Rambo, Lavie Tidhar, and others. Redstone SF has also published essays on science fiction literary criticism and the writing craft. The magazine initiated a writing contest in June 2010 to draw attention to issues of disability in science fiction.

Staff
Michael Ray, Co-Publisher, Editor 
Paul Clemmons, Publisher, Co-Editor
Cassondra Link, Assistant Editor
Ferlie, Assistant Editor
Mary Ann Locke, Assistant Editor

Critical reaction
Redstone Science Fiction was listed by Vision: A Resource for Writers as one of the top four places to submit science fiction short stories, along with Asimov's, Analog, and Lightspeed magazines.

In June 2011, Redstone Science Fiction was recognized as a professional market, a "Qualifying Short Fiction Venue", for membership in the Science Fiction and Fantasy Writers of America.

References

External links
 Redstone Science Fiction official website

Monthly magazines published in the United States
Online magazines published in the United States
Defunct science fiction magazines published in the United States
Magazines established in 2010
Magazines disestablished in 2012
Science fiction webzines
Science fiction magazines established in the 2010s